Legislative Assembly elections were held in the Indian state of West Bengal in 1996. 

The election took place simultaneously with the 1996 Indian general election.

Parties

Left Front
The Communist Party of India (Marxist) had fielded 70 new candidates, but many of them failed to get elected. The All India Forward Bloc had suffered a split before the election, with the emergence of the Forward Bloc (Socialist).

The Left Front supported Janata Dal candidates in five constituencies.

Indian National Congress

In the Congress Party, there was confrontation between West Bengal Pradesh Congress Committee president Somen Mitra and Indian Youth Congress leader Mamata Banerjee. Banerjee played an important role in rallying public support for the party.

The Congress leader Adhir Ranjan Chowdhury contested the Nabagram seat from jail, being imprisoned on murder charges. His speeches were recorded from prison and played at campaign meetings.

The Indian National Congress and the Jharkhand Mukti Morcha had entered into alliance.

Results
The Left Front won the election, entering into government for a fifth consecutive term. Winning 203 out of 294 seats, the 1996 election represented the first major electoral set-back for the Left Front since its foundation. The electoral losses were primarily felt in Calcutta and the industrial areas, and nine incumbent Left Front ministers failed to get re-elected. All JD candidates finished in second place and RCPI lost its representation in the assembly. However, in terms of votes the Left Front and the five JD candidates got 18,143,795 votes (49.3%). Jyoti Basu's fifth Left Front government was sworn in, with 48 ministers representing all 13 districts of the state.

Elected members

References

External links
 West Bangal General Legislative Election Results at the Election Commission of India

West Bengal
State Assembly elections in West Bengal
1990s in West Bengal
1996 in Indian politics